Caridina caerulea is a freshwater shrimp from Sulawesi. It is one of 11 species in the genus Caridina that is endemic to Lake Poso. It lives on a variety of substrates, including wood, rocks, sand and macrophytes. It is suspected only to live in shallow water.

References

Atyidae
Freshwater crustaceans of Asia
Crustaceans described in 2009
Endemic freshwater shrimp of Sulawesi